Gelanesaurus flavogularis is a species of lizard in the family Gymnophthalmidae. The species is endemic to Ecuador.

Geographic range
G. flavogularis is found in Napo and Tungurahua Provinces, eastern Ecuador.

Habitat

Description
G. flavogularis can be identified by the presence of calcareous spinules on flounces of the hemipenis. The tail is slightly compressed and lack tubercles. Tubercles are also absent from the sides of the neck and the gular region.

Reproduction
The mode of reproduction of G. flavogularis is unknown.

References

Further reading
Torres-Carvajal O, Lobos SE, Venegas PJ, Chávez G, Aguirre-Peñafiel V, Zurita D, Echevarría LY (2016). "Phylogeny and biogeography of the most diverse clade of South American gymnophthalmid lizards (Squamata, Gymnophthalmidae, Cercosaurinae)". Molecular Phylogenetics and Evolution 99: 63–75. (Gelanesaurus flavogularis, new combination).

flavogularis
Endemic fauna of Ecuador
Reptiles of Ecuador
Reptiles described in 2013
Taxa named by Marco Altamirano-Benavides
Taxa named by Hussam Zaher
Taxa named by Luciana Moreira Lobo
Taxa named by Felipe Gobbi Grazziotin
Taxa named by Pedro M. Sales-Nunes
Taxa named by Miguel Trefaut Rodrigues